Grotell is a crater on Mercury. Its name was adopted by the International Astronomical Union (IAU) on April 24, 2012. Grotell is named for the Finnish-American ceramist Maija Grotell.

References

Impact craters on Mercury